The 1986 NSL Cup (known as the 1986 Nanda Soccer Cup for sponsorship reasons) was the tenth season of the NSL Cup, which was the main national association football knockout cup competition in Australia. 32 teams from around Australia entered the competition.

First round

Round of 16

Quarter finals

Semi finals

Final

References

NSL Cup
1986 in Australian soccer
NSL Cup seasons